Bo Lennart Andersson (born 21 September 1956) is a Swedish curler.

Teams

References

External links
 

Living people
1956 births
Swedish male curlers
Swedish curling champions